

Medieval Times

Mali Empire

1,235 C.E. — 1,250 C.E. Early imperial expansion of the Mali Empire
1,235 C.E. — 1,255 C.E. Tiramakhan's western campaign
Tiramakhan, also known as Tiramaghan, of the Traore clan, was ordered by Sonjata to bring an army west after the king of Jolof had allowed horses to be stolen from Mandekalu merchants. The king of Jolof also sent a message to the young emperor referring to him as an upstart. By the time Tiramakhan's forces were done three kings were dead, and the Jolof ruler was reduced to a vassal.  The new western portion of the empire settlement would become an outpost that encompassed not only northern Guinea-Bissau but the Gambia and the Casamance region of Senegal (named for the Mandinka province of Casa or Cassa ruled by the Casa-Mansa).

Songhai Empire
1,440 C.E. — 1,490 C.E. The Mali Empire on the Defensive
1,444 C.E. The Portuguese arrived on the Senegambian coast in 1444, and they were not coming in peace.  Using caravels to launch slave raids on coastal inhabitants,

Modern Times

Kingdom of Waalo
1,659 C.E. French conquest of Senegal

French West Africa
1,754 C.E. — 1,763 C.E. Seven Years' War
April 1,758 C.E. — May 1,758 C.E. Capture of Senegal
December 1,758 C.E. Capture of Gorée
September 1, 1,939 C.E. — September 2, 1,945 C.E. World War II
September 23, 1,940 C.E. — September 25, 1,940 C.E. Battle of Dakar

Notes

See also
Military of Senegal
Senegalese Army
Senegalese Navy
Senegalese Air Force
Military history of Africa
African military systems to 1,800 C.E.
African military systems 1,800 C.E. — 1,900 C.E.
African military systems after 1,900 C.E.

Military history of Senegal
Conflicts
Conflicts